Burton A. Scott (February 16, 1935April 2, 2007) was an American attorney and judge. He was Chief Judge of the Wisconsin Court of Appeals from 1983 to 1989, near the end of a 19-year judicial career in Wisconsin.

Biography
Scott was born in Hazel Green, Wisconsin, on February 16, 1935. He attended high school in Randolph, Wisconsin and served in the United States Army before graduating from the University of Wisconsin-Madison and the University of Wisconsin Law School.

After working with a private practice, in 1964 Scott became the first corporation counsel to Kenosha County, Wisconsin.  The next year he became City Attorney for the city of Kenosha, Wisconsin, serving from 1965 to 1970.  In 1970, he was elected District Attorney of Kenosha County but served only one year, when he was appointed County Judge in Kenosha County by Governor Patrick Lucey.  He served as County Judge until 1978, when the county courts were merged into the state circuit courts to create a new single level of trial courts.  At that time, he became a Wisconsin Circuit Court judge for Kenosha County.  In 1980, he was elected to the Wisconsin Court of Appeals in Waukesha-based District II.  After 3 years on the court, he was appointed Chief Judge of the Court of Appeals, serving until 1989.  In 1988 he served as chair of the National Council of Chief Judges of the Courts of Appeals of the United States.

He retired in 1991 and became an associate dean of the National Judicial College in Reno, Nevada.

Personal life and family
Burton Scott married Evelyn C. Magnuson on December 31, 1957.  They had two children.  His and his wife's passion for education led them to play an important role in the 1960s campaign to establish a University of Wisconsin branch in the Kenosha area—University of Wisconsin–Parkside.  And they also campaigned for the 1978 referendum to fund construction of a new Mary D. Bradford High School building.

Judge Scott died on April 2, 2007, at his home in Somers, Wisconsin.

References

People from Hazel Green, Wisconsin
People from Randolph, Wisconsin
Politicians from Kenosha, Wisconsin
Wisconsin Court of Appeals judges
Wisconsin lawyers
Military personnel from Wisconsin
United States Army soldiers
University of Wisconsin–Madison alumni
University of Wisconsin Law School alumni
University of Nevada, Reno faculty
1935 births
2007 deaths
20th-century American judges
People from Somers, Wisconsin
20th-century American lawyers